Nilo Aguillar Effori (born 7 November 1981) is a Brazilian sports lawyer.

Education and career

Nilo Effori is a leading international sports lawyer. He was nominated as a thought leader in sports by Who's Who Legal in 2021 and 2022. His practice includes representation of parties before sports judicial bodies, including the Court of Arbitration for Sports, FIFA Dispute Resolution Chamber, Player's Status Committee and the Basketball Arbitral Tribunal.

He also advises clubs, agents and players on national and international transfers as well as handling contractual matters for clubs, agents, intermediaries and players.

Effori attended the Faculdades Integradas Antônio Eufrásio de Toledo in Presidente Prudente in Brazil and graduated in law.

Since 2006m he works as a sports lawyer, acting before the decision making bodies of International Sports Federation such as FIFA, FIBA, CAS, and IOC.

In November 2012, Effori joined the international law firm Dentons and from February 2014 to February 2015 worked at Mishcon de Reya in London as a sports lawyer.

Effori is the founding Partner of Effori Sports Law, a firm specialised in dispute resolution in sports based in London and Sao Paulo.

Published articles
 FIFA - International transfer of Minors (2014)
 International duty in football: five facts about the FIFA Regulations (2014)
 FIFA World Cup 2014 Ticket Touting Scandal (2014)
 Suarez's possible sanction explained – FIFA's legal perspective (2014)
 What the World Cup means to Brazil (2014)
 The Basketball Arbitral Tribunal (BAT) (2013)
 Developing young rugby players – is it worth it?  (2013)
 Where is FIFA when you need it? The Rio Branco, Araguaína, Brazil de Pelotas and Treze dispute (2012)
 An analysis of the General Statute of the 2014 FIFA World Cup Brazil  (2012)
 How to write an article about yourself (2013)
 Training compensation and solidarity contribution for Brazilian transfers  (2012)
 Tax relief to encourage sport: the Brazilian way  (2012)
 Contribuição de solidariedade - FIFA  (2012)
 Indenização por formação nas transferências internacionais de jogadores  (2012)
 Mudanças no futebol (2011)
 Transfer Matching System (TMS) (2010)
 Novas regras de trabalho no futebol do Reino Unido (2009)
 A contratação dos serviços prestados por agente de jogadores licenciado  (2008)
 Procedimento nas convocações  (2008)
 Imposto de renda de pessoa física e o futebol  (2007)

References
Article at http://www.lawinsport.com
Article at http://www.lawinsport.com
Article at http://www.universidadedofutebol.com.br
Article at http://www.migalhas.com.br
Article at http://www.migalhas.com.br
Article at http://www.lawinsport.com

External links
Profile at http://efforisl.com
Profile at http://www.lawinsport.com
News at http://www.unitoledo.br
News at http://www.repubblica.it
News at http://www.sportsdirect.com.uk
News at http://www.globoesporte.com

1981 births
Living people
21st-century Brazilian lawyers